Saints Victorian, Frumentius and Companions are venerated as Christian martyrs of the Roman Catholic Church. They were killed at Hadrumetum in 484 by the Arian Vandals.  Accounts of their martyrdom state that Huneric, King of the Vandals, began persecuting Catholic priests and virgins in 480, and by 484 began persecuting simple believers as well.  Victorian was a wealthy Catholic of Hadrumetum who had been appointed proconsul by Hunneric.  He served as an obedient administrator to the king until he was asked to convert to Arianism. Victorian refused and was tortured and killed.

The Roman Martyrology states that four other wealthy merchants were martyred on the same day as Victorian's death.  Two were named Frumentius; they were merchants of Carthage.  The other two were brothers of the city of Aquae Regiae, Byzacena, who were killed at Tabaia.

External links
Saints of March 23: Sts. Victorian, Frumentius, and Companions
St. Victorian - Saints & Angels - Catholic Online

Saints from the Vandal Kingdom
Martyred groups
484 deaths
5th-century Christian saints
Year of birth unknown
Saints trios